Clenchiellidae is a family of sea snails, marine gastropod molluscs in the superfamily Truncatelloidea.

Genera
 Clenchiella Abbott, 1948
 Coleglabra Ponder, H. Fukuda & Hallan, 2014
 Colenuda Ponder, H. Fukuda & Hallan, 2014
 Coliracemata Ponder, H. Fukuda & Hallan, 2014

References 

 Criscione F. & Ponder W.F. (2013) A phylogenetic analysis of rissooidean and cingulopsoidean families (Gastropoda: Caenogastropoda). Molecular Phylogenetics and Evolution 66: 1075–1082

External links
 The Taxonomicon
 Ponder, W. F.; Fukuda, H.; Hallan, A. (2014). A review of the family Clenchiellidae (Mollusca: Caenogastropoda: Truncatelloidea). Zootaxa. 3872(2): 101